The Schopfenspitz (2,104 m) (also known as Gros Brun) is a mountain of the Bernese Alps, overlooking Jaun in the canton of Fribourg. It is the culminating point of the group lying between Charmey and the Euschelspass.

References

External links

 Schopfenspitz on Hikr

Mountains of the Alps
Two-thousanders of Switzerland
Mountains of the canton of Fribourg
Mountains of Switzerland